Union Sportive Madinet d'Oran, known as USM Oran or simply USMO for short, is an Algerian football club based in Oran. The club was founded in 1926 and its colours are black and white. Their home stadium, Allal Toula Stadium, has a capacity of 5,000 spectators. The club is currently playing in the Régional I.

History

The club was founded on March 1, 1926 under the name of Union Sportive Musulmane Oranaise in Medina Jedida, a famous popular quarter of Oran, by the Algerian nationalist Sadek Boumaza with Bendouba "El Fellous", Benkoula, Boumefraa and others. They decided to create a team which became a multi-sports club some days after its creation. The club is the first one of North Africa to put the word Musulmane in its name to differentiate from other European colonial teams.

The club was also named NADIT Oran between 1977 and 1989

Crest

Stadium
The team plays in the Stade Allal Toula which holds 5,000 people.

Achievements

National
League of Oran
Champion (7) : 1933, 1943, 1944, 1945, 1946, 1949, 1950

Oran Cup
Winner (1) : 1952

Regional
North African Championship
Runner-up (3) : 1933, 1935, 1950
North African Cup
Runner-up (1) : 1954

Current Players
As of July, 2014.

Non-playing staff
Below the list of technical staff of 2022–23 season :

Director staff

Technical staff

Medical staff

Notable players
Below the list of some great players of the team around his history.

  Kader Firoud
  Baghdad Aboukebir
  Nacer Benchiha
  Kouider Bendjahène
  Mohamed Benhamou (Fenoun)
  Nedar Benlazreg (Zrego)
  Abdelkader Benzaoui
  Miloud Bouakeul
  Benaouda Boudjellal (Tchengo)
  Habib Draoua
  Mohamed El Andaloussi
  Abdelkader Fréha
  Mohamed Henkouche
  Souilem Gnaoui
  Senouci Medjahed
  Hamou Nafi
  Larbi Naïr
  Miloud Osman
  Bachir Sebaâ
  Hamida Tasfaout
  Lahouari Tekkouk
  ... Karsenty (Moustique)
  ... Martinez
  François Ange Pérez
  ... Rodriguez

Sponsors

Equipment
 2013–15  Baeko
 2015–16  Sarson Sports USA
 2016–21 ...
 2021–  Cuippssi

References

External links
USM Oran website

 
Football clubs in Algeria
USM Oran
Association football clubs established in 1926
1926 establishments in Algeria